In theoretical physics, specifically quantum field theory, a beta function, β(g), encodes the dependence of a coupling parameter, g, on the energy scale,  μ,  of a given physical process described by quantum field theory.
It is defined as
 
and, because of the underlying  renormalization group, it has no explicit dependence on μ, so it only depends on μ implicitly through  g.
This dependence on the energy scale thus specified is known as the running of the coupling parameter, a fundamental 
feature of  scale-dependence in quantum field theory, and its explicit computation is achievable through a variety of mathematical techniques.

Scale invariance
If the beta functions of a quantum field theory vanish, usually at particular values of the coupling parameters, then the theory is said to be scale-invariant. Almost all scale-invariant QFTs are also conformally invariant. The study of such theories is conformal field theory.

The coupling parameters of a quantum field theory can run even if the corresponding classical field theory is scale-invariant. In this case, the non-zero beta function tells us that the classical scale invariance is anomalous.

Examples
Beta functions are usually computed in some kind of approximation scheme. An example is perturbation theory, where one assumes that the coupling parameters are small. One can then make an expansion in powers of the coupling parameters and truncate the higher-order terms (also known as higher loop contributions, due to the number of loops in the corresponding Feynman graphs).

Here are some examples of beta functions computed in perturbation theory:

Quantum electrodynamics

The one-loop beta function in quantum electrodynamics (QED) is

or, equivalently,

written in terms of the fine structure constant in natural units, .

This beta function tells us that the coupling increases with increasing energy scale, and QED becomes strongly coupled at high energy. In fact, the coupling apparently becomes infinite at some finite energy, resulting in a Landau pole. However, one cannot expect the perturbative beta function to give accurate results at strong coupling, and so it is likely that the Landau pole is an artifact of applying perturbation theory in a situation where it is no longer valid.

Quantum chromodynamics

The one-loop beta function in quantum chromodynamics with  flavours and  scalar colored bosons is

or

written in terms of  αs =  .

If nf ≤ 16,  the ensuing beta function  dictates that the coupling decreases with increasing energy scale, a phenomenon known as asymptotic freedom. Conversely, the coupling increases with decreasing energy scale. This means that the coupling becomes large at low energies, and one can no longer rely on perturbation theory.

SU(N) Non-Abelian gauge theory

This famous result was derived nearly simultaneously in 1973 by Politzer, Gross and Wilczek,  for which the three were awarded the Nobel Prize in Physics in 2004.
Unbeknownst to these authors, G. 't Hooft had announced the result in a comment following a talk by K. Symanzik at a small meeting in Marseilles in June 1972, but he never published it.

Standard Model Higgs–Yukawa Couplings

In the Standard Model, quarks and leptons have "Yukawa couplings" to the Higgs boson. These determine the mass of the particle. Most all of the quarks' and leptons' Yukawa couplings are small compared to the top quark's Yukawa coupling. These Yukawa couplings change their values depending on the energy scale at which they are measured, through   running. The dynamics of Yukawa couplings of quarks are determined by the renormalization group equation:

,

This equation describes how the Yukawa coupling changes with energy scale .

The Yukawa couplings of the up, down, charm, strange and bottom quarks, are small at the extremely high energy scale of grand unification,  GeV.  Therefore, the  term can be neglected in the above equation. Solving, we then find that   is increased slightly at the low energy scales at which the quark masses are generated by the Higgs,  GeV.

On the other hand, solutions to this equation for large initial values  cause the rhs to quickly approach smaller values as we descend in energy scale. The above equation then locks  to the QCD coupling . This is known as the (infrared) quasi-fixed point of the renormalization group equation for the Yukawa coupling. No matter what the initial starting value of the coupling is, if it is sufficiently large it will reach this quasi-fixed point value, and the corresponding quark mass is predicted.

The value of the quasi-fixed point is fairly precisely determined in the Standard Model, leading to a predicted top quark mass of 230  GeV. The observed top quark mass of 174 GeV is slightly lower than the standard model prediction by about 30% which suggests there may be more Higgs doublets beyond the single standard model Higgs boson.

Minimal Supersymmetric Standard Model

Renomalization group studies in the Minimal Supersymmetric Standard Model (MSSM) of grand unification and the Higgs–Yukawa fixed points were very encouraging that the theory was on the right track. So far, however, no evidence of the predicted MSSM particles has emerged in experiment at the Large Hadron Collider.

See also
Banks–Zaks fixed point
Callan–Symanzik equation
Quantum triviality

References

Further reading
 Peskin, M and Schroeder, D.; An Introduction to Quantum Field Theory, Westview Press (1995). A standard introductory text, covering many topics in QFT including calculation of beta functions; see especially chapter 16.
 Weinberg, Steven; The Quantum Theory of Fields, (3 volumes) Cambridge University Press (1995). A monumental treatise on QFT.
 Zinn-Justin, Jean; Quantum Field Theory and Critical Phenomena, Oxford University Press (2002). Emphasis on the renormalization group and related topics.

Renormalization group
Scaling symmetries